Nachtbringer is the third EP from German futurepop band Blutengel. It was released as a single CD, and limited edition CD/DVD. The DVD is a live performance from the Tränenherz Tour 2011.
To promote the EP, a music video for Nachtbringer was made.

Track listing

References

External links

2011 EPs
Blutengel albums